St. Elmo is a 1923 American silent drama film directed by Jerome Storm. Distributed by Fox Film Corporation, the film is based on the 1867 novel of the same name written by Augusta Jane Evans.

Plot
When St. Elmo Thornton catches his fiancée Agnes in the arms of his best friend Murray Hammond, he shoots Hammond and decides to travel around the world in hopes of forgetting women. Upon returning, he meets Edna, the blacksmith's daughter who is living with his minister. In the end, St. Elmo becomes a minister and marries Edna.

Cast

Production
During the filming of St. Elmo, John Gilbert and Barbara La Marr had an "intense sexual affair".

A British adaptation of the same source material was made the same year.

Preservation
With no prints of St. Elmo located in any film archives, it is a lost film.

See also
 List of lost films
 1937 Fox vault fire

References

External links

Lantern slide for a re-issue of the film

1923 drama films
1923 lost films
1923 films
American black-and-white films
Silent American drama films
American silent feature films
Films based on American novels
Films with screenplays by Jules Furthman
Fox Film films
Lost American films
Lost drama films
Films directed by Jerome Storm
1920s American films
1920s English-language films